The Father Mychal Judge is a NY Waterway ferry named in honor of Mychal Judge, a New York City priest who was a victim of al Qaeda's attacks on September 11, 2001.

The vessel was christened in March 2002.
The ferry participated in the rescue of passengers of US Airways Flight 1549 that made a successful emergency landing on the Hudson River on 15 January 2009.
On April 6, 2012, her captain, Mohamed Gouda, led his crew in a second rescue of the crew of capsized barge Katherine G..

References

2002 ships
Ferries of New York City
Ferries of New Jersey